Leukocyte esterase (LE) is an esterase (a type of enzyme) produced by leukocytes (white blood cells). A leukocyte esterase test (LE test) is a urine test for the presence of white blood cells and other abnormalities associated with infection.

White blood cells in the urine can indicate a urinary tract infection (UTI). Positive test results may be clinically significant in the right context. The LE test is also used to screen for gonorrhea and for amniotic fluid infections. The combination of the LE test with the urinary nitrite test provides an excellent screen for establishing the presence of a UTI. Urine test strips (dipsticks) can screen for both. A urine sample that tests positive for both nitrite and leukocyte esterase should be cultured for pathogenic bacteria.

"It has been proposed that the reagent strip for leukocyte esterase designed for the testing of urine (Combur test UX) could be a useful tool for diagnosing spontaneous bacterial peritonitis (SBP)."  Braga et al. concluded that the Combur test UX urine screening test is a very sensitive and specific method for diagnosing SBP in the ascitic fluid of cirrhotic patients who have undergone paracentesis."

References

External links
 
 Leukocyte esterase urine test at MedlinePlus

Urine tests